Crassopleura is a genus of sea snails, marine gastropod mollusks in the family Drilliidae.

Species
Species within the genus Crassopleura include:
 Crassopleura maravignae (Bivona Ant. in Bivona And., 1838)
Species brought into synonymy
 † Crassopleura incrassata (Dujardin, 1837): synonym of Crassopleura maravignae (Bivona Ant. in Bivona And., 1838)

References

 Monterosato T. A. (di) (1884). Nomenclatura generica e specifica di alcune conchiglie mediterranee. Palermo, Virzi, 152 pp

External links
 WMSDB - Worldwide Mollusc Species Data Base: family Drilliidae

 
Gastropod genera